Representative may refer to:

Politics
Representative democracy, type of democracy in which elected officials represent a group of people
House of Representatives, legislative body in various countries or sub-national entities
Legislator, someone who is a member of a legislature

Mathematics
Representative (mathematics), an element of an equivalence class representing the class

Other uses
Sales representative
Manufacturers' representative
Customer service representative
Holiday rep
Representative sample, in statistics a sample or subset meant to represent a population
Representative director (Japan), most senior executive in charge of managing a corporation in Japan
The Representative (newspaper), unsuccessful 1826 London newspaper

See also 
 
Representation (disambiguation)
Rep (disambiguation)
Presentative (disambiguation)
Special Representative, a diplomatic rank
The Representative (disambiguation)